191st may refer to:

191st (Southern Alberta) Battalion, CEF, a unit in the Canadian Expeditionary Force during the First World War
191st Air Refueling Squadron, a unit of the Utah Air National Guard
191st Airlift Group, an airlift unit located at Selfridge ANGB, Michigan
191st Infantry Brigade (United States), formed as part of the United States Army Reserve's 96th Division
191st Ohio Infantry (or 191st OVI), an infantry regiment in the Union Army during the American Civil War
191st Street (IRT Broadway – Seventh Avenue Line), a station on the IRT Broadway – Seventh Avenue Line of the New York City Subway

See also
191 (number)
191, the year 191 (CXCI) of the Julian calendar
191 BC